Nova Scotia is a province of Canada.

Nova Scotia may also refer to:

 Nova Scotia (ship), a list of ships with the name
 Nova Scotia (album), a 2005 album by Cousteau
 Nova Scotia: New Scottish Speculative Fiction, a 2005 science fiction and fantasy anthology 
 Nova Scotia, Bristol, an historic nineteenth-century public house in Bristol, England
 45556 Nova Scotia, a British LMS Jubilee Class locomotive

See also
 New Caledonia (disambiguation)
 New Scotland (disambiguation)
 New Albany (disambiguation)
 Scotia (disambiguation)